Marianela Pereyra is an American-Argentine TV host, health advocate, writer and actress.

References

1979 births
Living people
American female models
Argentine emigrants to the United States
American television personalities
American women television personalities
21st-century American women